Brian Keith Jackson (born 1968), is an American novelist, essayist and culture writer based in Harlem, New York.

Early life and education 
Jackson was raised in Monroe, Louisiana, the only child of a middle-class family. He and was influenced by the compassion and wisdoms bequeathed to him by his great-grandmother, whom he knew personally and who survived the end of slavery. He earned a bachelor's degree, studying journalism, from University of Louisiana in Monroe. After graduating Jackson moved to Flint, Michigan in and began working on a newspaper there.

Career 
Jackson moved to New York in 1990 with hopes of becoming an actor. He became frustrated with the roles available to him and began playwriting to create the roles he was looking for. The first time he incorporated gay characters into his writing was in his plays, unpacking the characters as part of communities and relatable rather than a stereotypical trope. His plays were performed and read at Nuyorican Poets Cafe, La Mama, Barnes and Noble and Theatre for the New City.

Jackson has written for New York Magazine, Paper Magazine, The London Observer, Nylon Magazine and various publications about art and contemporary culture. He gleans inspiration from everyday things. He began writing novels in order to "cut out the middle man" and have direct impact and trust with his audience.

Inspired by Jackson's great-grandmother's rural Southern experience, he wrote his first novel in 1997, at age 29, The View From Here (1997), which was set in 1950s Mississippi. It was compared to Alice Walker's The Color Purple and translated to French and a best seller in South Africa.

Walking Through Mirrors (1998), Jackson's second novel, is about a Black photographer returning to his home in Louisiana from New York.

Jackson wrote his The Queen of Harlem, before the Harlem's redevelopment about a man who reclaims his Black identity. It was on the artist Kehinde Wiley's ten favorite books in 2016.

Awards 
Jackson's first novel was completed with a fellowship from Art Matters Foundation and it won the American Library Association Black Caucus' First Fiction Award.  He won a fellowship from the Millay Colony of the Arts.

Personal life 
When Jackson moved to New York he was a model for ACT UP.

Jackson has spent extensive time traveling the world. He has visited over forty-eight states and twenty-five countries, inspired by the idea that his brown skin might blend in better in other countries than in America, with its racially tumultuous past. He lived in Beijing for four years and Tunisia.

Jackson often writes essays for the monographs of his dear friend, artist Kehinde Wiley. He is a frequent collaborator and supporter of artists.

Bibliography 

Monographs
Jackson, Brian Keith. The Queen of Harlem. New York : Harlem Moon, 2003.   
Jackson, Brian Keith. Walking Through Mirrors. New York : Washington Square Press,1998.   
Jackson, Brian Keith. The View from Here.  New York : Washington Square Press, 1997.   
Essays
“Quiet as It's Kept.” Kehinde Wiley, by Sarah E. Lewis, ... Thelma Golden, Rizzoli, 2012.  
Jackson, Brian Keith., and Krista A. Thompson. Kehinde Wiley: Black Light. PowerHouse Books, 2009.    
"The Same, Yet Not ." Wiley, Kehinde. Kehinde Wiley - Columbus. Columbus Museum of Art, 2006.  
“How to Handle a Boy in Women's Shoes.” Freedom in This Village: Twenty-Five Years of Black Gay Men's Writing, 1979 to the Present, by E. Lynn Harris, Carroll & Graf, 2005.  

Excerpts
“Walking Through Mirrors (1998).” Black like Us: a Century of Lesbian, Gay, and Bisexual African American Fiction, by Devon W. Carbado et al., Cleis Press, 2012.  
“The Queen of Harlem.” Gumbo: an Anthology of African American Writing, by Marita Golden and E. Lynn. Harris, Harlem Moon, 2002.  
“The View from Here .” Shade: an Anthology of Fiction by Gay Men of African Descent, by Bruce Morrow and Charles H. Rowell, Avon Books, 1996.

References 

Living people
1968 births
Writers from New York City
University of Louisiana at Monroe alumni
American male novelists
20th-century American novelists
Writers from Louisiana
21st-century American novelists
20th-century American essayists
21st-century American essayists
American male essayists
20th-century American male writers
21st-century American male writers